Ruskets was a cereal product consisting of pressed biscuits of toasted wheat flakes. They were produced by Loma Linda Foods, a health food company owned by the Seventh-day Adventist Church. In 1938 the company's main product was Ruskets.  A similar item, "Weet-Bix", remains popular in many countries.

See also
Shredded Wheat cereal brand

References

 "Loma Linda Foods offers new cereals". Central Union Reaper v45 (August 1, 1976), p14. Also republished in Gleaner (North Pacific Union) v71 (October 4, 1976), p2; Northern Union Outlook v40 (August 30, 1976), p14; Pacific Union Recorder v76 (July 26, 1976), p[1]
 "LLF announces the return of Ruskets". Central Union Reaper v48 (January 11, 1979), p9

External links
History of Loma Linda foods

Seventh-day Adventist Church
Breakfast cereals